Chitranjan Swaroop (9 March 1946 – 19 August 2015) was an Indian politician and a member of the 16th Legislative Assembly of Uttar Pradesh of India. He represented the Muzaffarnagar constituency of Uttar Pradesh and was a member of the Samajwadi political party.

Early life and education
Chitranjan Swaroop was born in Muzaffarnagar district, Uttar Pradesh. Swaroop was a graduate. Before being elected as MLA, he used to work as an agriculturist.

Political career
Chitranjan Swaroop was a MLA for three terms. During all three terms, he represented the Muzaffarnagar constituency. Swaroop was earlier a member of the Indian National Congress party and in 1974 (his first term in office) he was a member of the Indian National Congress.

Death 
Swaroop died on 19 August 2015 in New Delhi where he was undergoing treatment.

Posts held

See also
Muzaffarnagar
Uttar Pradesh Legislative Assembly
Government of India
Politics of India
Samajwadi Party
Indian National Congress

References 

Uttar Pradesh politicians
Samajwadi Party politicians
People from Muzaffarnagar district
1946 births
2015 deaths
Indian National Congress politicians